In enzymology, a glutamate synthase (ferredoxin) is an enzyme that catalyzes the chemical reaction

2 L-glutamate + 2 oxidized ferredoxin  L-glutamine + 2-oxoglutarate + 2 reduced ferredoxin + 2 H+

Thus, the two substrates of this enzyme are L-glutamate and oxidized ferredoxin, whereas its 4 products are L-glutamine, 2-oxoglutarate, reduced ferredoxin, and H+.

Classification 

This enzyme belongs to the family of oxidoreductases, specifically those acting on the CH-NH2 group of donors with an iron-sulfur protein as acceptor.

Nomenclature 

The systematic name of this enzyme class is L-glutamate:ferredoxin oxidoreductase (transaminating). Other names in common use include:
 ferredoxin-dependent glutamate synthase,
 ferredoxin-glutamate synthase,
 glutamate synthase (ferredoxin-dependent), and
 ferredoxin-glutamine oxoglutarate aminotransferase (Fd-GOGAT).

Biological role 

This enzyme participates in nitrogen metabolism.  It has 5 cofactors: FAD, iron, sulfur, iron-sulfur,  and flavoprotein.

See also

Glutamate synthase (NADH)
Glutamate synthase (NADPH)

References

 
 

Flavoproteins
Iron enzymes
Sulfur enzymes
Iron-sulfur enzymes
Enzymes of known structure
EC 1.4.7